Ska'n'B is the first album by British 2 Tone and ska band Bad Manners from the year 1980. It reached number 34 on the UK album chart.

Track listing
All songs by Bad Manners unless noted.
 "Ne-Ne Na-Na Na-Na Nu-Nu" (Eddie Dean, Al Dredick) – 2:35
 "Here Comes the Major" – 2:54
 "Fatty Fatty" (Clancy Eccles, Leroy Sibbles) – 2:25
 "King Ska/Fa" – 4:22
 "Monster Mash" (Leonard Capizzi, Bobby "Boris" Pickett) – 3:01
 "Caledonia" (Louis Jordan, Fleecie Moore) – 2:58
 "Magnificent 7" (Elmer Bernstein) – 2:31
 "Wooly Bully" (Domingo Samudio) – 3:09
 "Lip Up Fatty" – 2:48
 "Special Brew" – 3:37
 "Inner London Violence" – 3:56
 "Scruffy, The Huffy Chuffy Tugboat" – 1:39
 2011 Bonus Tracks
 "Holidays" – 2:12
 "Night Bus to Dalston" – 2:18
 "Lip Up Fatty" (Extended Edition) – 4:42
 "Special Brew" (Single Version) – 3:19
 "Ivor The Engine" – 2:27

Personnel
Bad Manners
Buster Bloodvessel – vocals
Louis 'Alphonso' Cook – guitar
David Farren – bass
Brian Tuitt – drums
Martin Stewart – keyboards
Chris Kane – saxophone
Andrew Marson – saxophone
Paul "Gus" Hyman – trumpet
Winston Bazoomies – harmonica

Credits
Roger Lomas – Production

Notes
Recorded at Horizon Studios, Coventry

References

1980 debut albums
Bad Manners albums
Magnet Records albums